Chermayeff may refer to:

Chermayeff & Geismar, a prominent design studio in New York
Serge Chermayeff, a British architect